Ranixalidae is a family of frogs commonly known as the leaping frogs or Indian frogs. They are endemic to central and southern India.

Genera
There are two genera with a total 18 species:
Indirana Laurent, 1986 — 14 species
Walkerana Dahanukar, Modak, Krutha, Nameer, Padhye, and Molur, 2016 — 4 species

The respective species counts in the AmphibiaWeb are 15 (because Indirana tenuilingua, a nomen inquirendum, is listed) and three (Walkerana muduga Dinesh et al., 2020 not (yet) listed).

References

 
Endemic fauna of India